The 3rd Army Aviation Support Regiment "Aquila" is an Italian Army unit based at Orio al Serio Airport near Bergamo in Lombardy. The regiment is part of the Italian army's army aviation and assigned to the Army Aviation Support Brigade.  The regiment provides 2nd-line maintenance, upgrade and test services for the A129D Mangusta attack helicopters of the 5th Army Aviation Regiment "Rigel" and 7th Army Aviation Regiment "Vega".

History 
On 1 September 1965 the 3rd Army Light Aviation Repairs Unit was formed at the Orio al Serio Airport in Bergamo. The unit consisted of a command, a command squadron, a supply section, an inspection and recovery section, an aircraft maintenance and repair section, a helicopter maintenance and repair section, and a subsystems repair section. The unit provided technical-logistical services for flying units of the III Army Corps, IV Army Corps, and V Army Corps.

On 12 December 1989 the unit was granted its own flag by the President of the Italian Republic Francesco Cossiga. In 1990 the unit consisted of a command, an administration office, an aviation materiel office, a general services department, a technical department, and aircraft squadron. On 2 June 1993 the unit was renamed 3rd Army Aviation Repairs Unit. On 1 September 1996 the unit was renamed 3rd Army Aviation Support Regiment "Aquila". In 2012 the regiment was assigned to the Army Aviation Support Command, which on 31 July 2019 was renamed Army Aviation Support Brigade.

Naming 
Since the 1975 army reform Italian army aviation units are named for celestial objects: support regiments are numbered with a single digit and named for one of the 88 modern constellations. As in 1996 the 3rd Army Aviation Repairs Unit was supporting the 4th Army Aviation Regiment "Altair", which was named for Altair, the brightest star in the Aquila constellation, the army decided to name the new 3rd Army Aviation Support Regiment "Aquila" to affirm the two regiments' relationship.

As the regiment was founded in the city of Bergamo the regiment's coats of arms fourth quarter depicts Bergamo's coat of arms.

Current Structure 
As of 2022 the 3rd Army Aviation Support Regiment "Aquila" consists of:

  3rd Army Aviation Support Regiment "Aquila", at Orio al Serio Airport
 Headquarters Unit
 Command and Logistic Support Squadron
 Maintenance Unit
 1st Repair Squadron
 2nd Repair Squadron
 3rd Repair Squadron
 Technical and Test Section
 Air-materiel Supply Section
 External Work Section
 Flight Squadron (AB206 helicopters)

See also 
 Army Aviation

External links
Italian Army Website: 3° Reggimento Sostegno Aviazione dell'Esercito "Aquila"

References

Army Aviation Regiments of Italy